Jamie Clark is a Lebanon international rugby league footballer.

Background
Clark was born in Australia.

Playing career
Clark is a Canterbury-Bankstown Bulldogs junior and has played for Lebanon since 2007, including in the 2009 European Cup. He was named in the Lebanese squad for the 2017 Rugby League World Cup.

References

External links
2017 RLWC profile

1987 births
Living people
Australian rugby league players
Lebanon national rugby league team captains
Lebanon national rugby league team players
Rugby league hookers